J.C. Berry's Dry Goods Store is a historic commercial building at 331 Old South Main Street in Yellville, Arkansas.  It is a two-story block, built out of local limestone with pressed metal trim.  The ground floor has a glass commercial store front, sheltered by a porch, and the second story has a bank of six windows, each flanked by a pair of Ionic pilasters.  The roof has an extended overhang supported by brackets, and a highly decorated parapet.  The metal elements of the facade were manufactured by the Mesker Brothers, a nationally known producer of metal architectural goods based in St. Louis, Missouri.  The building was built in 1903 by J.C. Berry, and was operated as a dry goods business until 1912, when Berry's nephew Rex Floyd converted it for use as a hotel after his Park Hotel burned down.  The hotel closed in 1952, and the building has seen a succession of mixed commercial and residential uses.

The building was listed on the National Register of Historic Places in 2003.

See also
National Register of Historic Places listings in Marion County, Arkansas

References

Commercial buildings on the National Register of Historic Places in Arkansas
Commercial buildings completed in 1903
National Register of Historic Places in Marion County, Arkansas
1903 establishments in Arkansas
Early Commercial architecture in the United States
Buildings designated early commercial in the National Register of Historic Places
Yellville, Arkansas